Margaret of the Palatinate (German: Margarete von der Pfalz; 1376 – 26 August 1434, Einville-au-Jard) was the daughter of Rupert of Germany and his wife Elisabeth of Nuremberg. She married Charles II, Duke of Lorraine on 6 February 1393. Her maternal grandparents were Frederick V, Burgrave of Nuremberg and Elisabeth of Meissen. One of her grandchildren was Margaret of Anjou, Queen Consort of King Henry VI of England.

Her children with Charles II of Lorraine included:
Isabella, Duchess of Lorraine (1400–1453), heiress of Lorraine and wife of René I of Naples
Louis (died young)
Ralph (died young)
Catherine de Lorraine (1407–1439), wife of Jacob, Margrave of Baden

References

Sources

External links
 MARGARETA Pfalzgräfin 

1376 births
1434 deaths
House of Wittelsbach
Duchesses of Lorraine
14th-century German women
14th-century German nobility
15th-century German women
15th-century German nobility
14th-century French women
14th-century French nobility
15th-century French women
15th-century French people
15th-century French nobility
Daughters of kings